Milovan Danojlić (3 July 1937 – 23 November 2022) was a Serbian poet, essayist and literary critic best known for his children's poetry. Danojlić was a full member of the Serbian Academy of Science and Arts.

Biography
Danojlić published his first poems in 1954, while his first independent book "Urođenički psalmi" was published in 1957. He was a lecturer on the Serbo-Croatian language at the University of Poitiers from 1977 to 1978.

Danojlić was a selected artist of the Fulbright program Artist-in-residence at the UMass Amherst from 1980 to 1981.

In 1982, he was a founding member of the Committee for the Protection of Artistic Freedom (Odbor za zaštitu umetničke slobode), together with Biljana Jovanović, Dragoslav Mihailović and others. Since 1984, he alternately lived as freelance writer in Paris and Belgrade, and worked as occasional freelance associate at Radio France. In 1989, he was a member of the Founding Committee of the Democratic Party (together with his writer colleagues Borislav Pekić, Gojko Đogo and Dušan Vukajlović), which was the first Yugoslav opposition and non-communist party since 1945.

Danojlić published more than 70 books of fiction and poetry in the Serbian language. His most famous books are: Neka vrsta cirkusa (Some kind of circus); Lične stvari - ogledi o sebi i o drugima (Personal things - reflections on yourself and others) and Balada o siromaštvu (Balad on poverty).

Danojlić was a member of the Serbian Academy of Sciences and Arts from 2000, and president of the Serbian Literary Guild since 2013.

Danojlić was married to Sanja Bošković (born in Sarajevo, living in France since 1988), and was the father of two sons (born 1992 and 1993).

Danojlić died in Paris on 23 November 2022, at the age of 85.

Works 

 Urođenički psalmi, Nolit, Belgrade, 1957
 Nedelja, Lykos, Zagreb, 1959
 Kako spavaju tramvaji, Lykos, Zagreb, 1959
 Noćno proleće, Progres, Novi Sad, 1960
 Balade, Nolit, Belgrade, 1966
 Lirske rasprave, Matica srpska, Novi Sad, 1967
 Furunica-jogunica, Kulturni centar, Novi Sad, 1969
 Glasovi, nezavisno izdanje, Belgrade, 1970
 Čudnovat dan, Mlado pokolenje, Belgrade, 1971
 O ranom ustajanju, Matica srpska, Novi Sad, 1972
 Rodna godina, BIGZ, Belgrade, 1972
 Onde potok, onde cvet, Zmajeve dečje igre/Radnički univerzitet, Novi Sad, 1973
 Čistine, Matica srpska, Novi Sad, 1973
 Grk u zatvoru, August Cesarec, Zagreb, 1975
 Naivna pesma, Nolit, Belgrade, 1976
 Put i sjaj, Matica srpska, Novi Sad, 1976
 Kako je Dobrislav protrčao kroz Jugoslaviju, BIGZ, Belgrade, 1977
 Muka s rečima, Slobodan Mašić, Belgrade, 1977
 Pesme, Nolit, Belgrade, 1978
 Tačka otpora, Liber, Zagreb, 1978
 Zimovnik, Zbirka Biškupić, Zagreb, 1979
 Zmijin svlak, Nolit, Belgrade, 1979
 Rane i nove pesme, Prosveta, Belgrade, 1979
 Kako živi poljski miš, Narodna knjiga, Belgrade, 1980
 Senke oko kuće, Znanje, Zagreb, 1980
 To : vežbe iz upornog posmatranja, Prosveta, Belgrade, 1980
 Srećan život, Mladost, Zagreb, 1981
 Mišja rupa, M. Danojlić/M. Josić, Belgrade, 1982
 Sunce je počelo da se zlati, Zavod za izdavanje udžbenika, Novi Sad, 1982
 Čišćenje alata, M. Danojlić/S. Mašić, Belgrade, 1982
 Brisani prostor, Srpska književna zadruga, Belgrade, 1984
 Podguznica, M.Josić/M. Danojlić, Belgrade, 1984
 Šta sunce večera, Rad, Belgrade, 1984
 Kao divlja zver : teškoće s ljudima i sa stvarima, Filip Višnjić, Belgrade, 1985
 Večiti nailazak : stihovi, Jugoslavika, Toronto, 1986
 Dragi moj Petroviću, Znanje, Zagreb, 1986
 Čekajući da stane pljusak, [s.n.], Paris, 1986
 Pisati pod nadzorom, Nova Jugoslavija, Vranje, 1987
 Neka vrsta cirkusa, Književna omladina Srbije, Belgrade, 1989
 Zlo i naopako, BIGZ, Belgrade, 1991
 Godina prolazi kroz avliju, Srpska književna zadruga, Belgrade, 1992
 Pesme za vrlo pametnu decu, Prosveta, Belgrade, 1994
 Da mi je znati : izbor iz poezije za decu, Zmaj, Novi Sad, 1995
 Na obali, Gradska biblioteka, Čačak, 1995
 Mesto rođenja, Filip Višnjić, Belgrade, 1996
 Muka duhu, Draganić, Belgrade, 1996
 Teško buđenje, Plato, Belgrade, 1996
 Šta čovek da radi, Obrazovanje, Novi Sad, 1996
 Jesen na pijaci, Školska knjiga, Novi Sad, 1997
 Nedelja u našoj ulici, Todor, Novi Sad, 1997
 Oslobodioci i izdajnici, Filip Višnjić, Belgrade, 1997
 Balada o siromaštvu, Filip Višnjić, Belgrade, 1999
 Veliki ispit, Verzal Press, Belgrade, 1999
 Kako je kralj Koba Jagi napustio presto, Intelekta, Valjevo, 2000
 Pevanija za decu, Dečje novine, Gornji Milanovac, 2000
 Lične stvari : ogledi o sebi i drugima, Plato, Belgrade, 2001
 Ograda na kraju Beograda, Bookland, Belgrade, 2001
 Pustolovina ili Ispovest u dva glasa, Filip Višnjić, Belgrade, 2002
 Zečji tragovi, Filip Višnjić, Belgrade, 2004
 Srbija na zapadu, NB "Stefan Prvovenčani", Kraljevo, 2005
 Čovek čoveku, Književna zajednica "Borisav Stanković", Vranje, 2006
 Pešački monolog, Plato, Belgrade, 2007
 Učenje jezika, Srpska književna zadruga, Belgrade, 2008
 Priča o pripovedaču, IP Matica srpska, Novi Sad, 2009
 Crno ispod noktiju, Plato, Belgrade, 2010
 Dobro jeste živeti, Albatros Plus, Belgrade, 2010
 Iznuđene ispovesti, Plato, Belgrade, 2010
 Pisma bez adrese, Službeni glasnik, Belgrade, 2012
 Hrana za ptice, Albatros Plus, Belgrade, 2014

References

1937 births
2022 deaths
People from Ljig
Serbian novelists
Serbian male poets
Members of the Serbian Academy of Sciences and Arts
Serbian expatriates in France
Serbian children's writers
University of Belgrade Faculty of Philology alumni
Democratic Party (Serbia) politicians